The sinlessness of Mary refers to the doctrine in which Mary, mother of Jesus chose not to sin. It is upheld by the Roman Catholic Church, Eastern Orthodox Church, as well as by high church Lutherans.

Early Church
Justin Martyr, Irenaeus, and Cyril of Jerusalem developed the idea of Mary as the New Eve, drawing comparison to "... Eve, while yet immaculate and incorrupt — that is to say, not subject to original sin." So too, Ephrem the Syrian said she was as innocent as Eve before  the Fall.
Ambrose says she is incorrupt, a virgin immune through grace from every stain of sin. It was John Damascene's opinion that the supernatural influence of God at the generation of Mary was so comprehensive that it extended also to her parents. He says of them that, during the generation, they were filled and purified by the Holy Spirit, and freed from sexual concupiscence. Consequently according to Damascene, even the human element of her origin, the material of which she was formed, was pure and holy. This opinion of an immaculate active generation and the sanctity of the "conceptio carnis" was taken up by some Western authors. The Greek Fathers never formally or explicitly discussed the question of the Immaculate Conception.

By the 4th century the sinlessness of Mary was a common belief. Augustine in the 5th century upheld that Mary had no personal sin, but Augustine did not clearly affirm that she was free from original sin. Ambrose also held similar views as Augustine concerning the sinlessness of Mary. 

Protestant apologist, James White has argued that many Greek Fathers denied the sinlessness of Mary, this includes John Chrysostom, Origen, Basil, and Cyril of Alexandria. J.N.D. Kelly also argued that Tertullian and Hilary of Poitiers believed that Mary had imperfections.

Origen of Alexandria 
In Origen's Homilies on Luke xvii.6 he states:

Thereupon Simeon says, "a sword will pierce your very soul" (Lk 2.35). Which sword is this that pierced not only others' hearts, but even Mary's? Scripture clearly records that, at the time of the Passion, all the apostles were scandalized. The Lord himself said, "This night you will all be scandalized" (Mk 14.27). Thus, they were all so scandalized that Peter too, the leader of the apostles, denied him three times. Why do we think that the mother of the Lord was immune from scandal when the apostles were scandalized? If she did not suffer scandal at the Lord's Passion, then Jesus did not die for her sins. But, if "all have sinned and lack God's glory, but are justified by his grace and redeemed" (Rom 3.23) then Mary too was scandalized at that time."

Eastern Orthodoxy 
The Eastern Orthodox Churches teach that while Mary "inherited the same fallen nature, prone to sin" as with other humans, "she did not consent to sin through her free will." Due to being conceived in ancestral sin, Mary still needed "to be delivered by our Savior, her Son" according to Eastern Orthodox teaching.

Oriental Orthodoxy 
The concept of original sin and the Sinlessness of Mary in Oriental Orthodox Churches is the same as that of what is believed by Eastern Orthodox. However, The Ethiopian Orthodox Church do believe that Mary did not contract ancestral sin at Her conception, even if it is not dogmatically defined by the Church.

Lutheranism 
 
Martin Luther taught the lifelong sinlessness of Mary, a doctrine inherited by those of the high church Lutheran tradition. The Smalcald Articles, a Lutheran confession of faith, declare "that the Son became man in this manner: he was conceived by the Holy Spirit, without the cooperation of man, and was born of the pure, holy, and ever-virgin Mary." Lutheran writer Kristofer Carlson in explicating the Book of Concord, writes that "When Lutherans confess Mary as pure & holy, it is a reference to the chastity and sinlessness of Mary."

Comparison with Roman Catholic dogma 
 
The Catholic Church teaches the Immaculate Conception, that Mary was conceived without original sin. Kenneth Baker writes that:

The encyclical Mystici corporis Christi from Pope Pius XII (1943) holds that Mary was also sinless personally, "free from all sin, original or personal".

The Catechism of the Catholic Church teaches that by the grace of God "Mary remained free of every personal sin her whole life long."

See also 

 Sinfulness of Mary

References 

Mariology
Eastern Orthodox Mariology
Lutheran theology
Protestant views on Mary